Tony Savage may refer to:

 Anthony Savage (1893–1970), American basketball and baseball player and coach of American football and basketball
 Tony Savage (American football) (born 1967), American football defensive tackle
 Gordon Savage (ice hockey) (1906–1974), known as Tony, ice hockey player